Maccus is a personal name which is first attested and possibly coined in the tenth century, the name Maccus, later also written as Mac(c)hus, was especially common in the Border country: 
Maccus mac Arailt (fl. 971–974), also Maccus Haraldsson.
Maccus son of Anlaf, named as Eric Bloodaxe's murderer.
A minor thane who fought at the Battle of Maldon and is mentioned in the poem of the same name. 
Element in place-names of the Scottish borders, e.g. Longformacus (Scottish Gaelic Longphort Maccus), Maxton (English Maccuses tun) and Maxwell(town) (Maccuses wylle).

For a discussion of the origin and development of the name, see David E. Thornton, "Hey Mac! The name Maccus, tenth to fifteenth centuries." Nomina 20 (1997-9): 67-94, with appendix by O.J. Padel on Talkarn Mackus, 95-8.

Fictional character
A hammer-headed member of the Flying Dutchman crew in the film series Pirates of the Caribbean, played by Dermot Keaney (IMDB).
Maccus or Macchus:
a stock character in Atellan Farce
a related, long-nosed figure in puppetry, similar to the stock character Pulcinella